Yu-Gi-Oh! Go Rush!! is the eighth main anime series in the Yu-Gi-Oh! franchise and the twelfth anime series overall. On December 17, 2021, TV Tokyo announced that Yu-Gi-Oh! Go Rush!! would premiere on April 3, 2022, on TV Tokyo and BS TV Tokyo, with key staff members from Yu-Gi-Oh! Sevens returning for their respective positions: Nobuhiro Kondo is directing the series at Bridge, Toshimitsu Takeuchi is in charge of series' scripts, and Kazuko Tadano and Hiromi Matsushita are designing the characters.



Episode list

Notes

References

Go Rush!!
Yu-Gi-Oh! Go Rush!!